Henry Evan Brereton (13 June 1887 – 31 December 1950) was an Australian rules footballer who played with Melbourne and South Melbourne in the Victorian Football League (VFL).

Football
Originally recruited from Port Melbourne, Brereton made a startling entry into VFL football in 1909. After a slow start, he kicked nine goals against Geelong in only his seventh match. This was the most goals kicked by a player in a match since Jim McShane kicked eleven against St Kilda in 1899, and Brereton continued to top Melbourne's goalkicking for the year with 34 goals.

After a disappointing 1910, Brereton, who was one of the most accurate kicks in the VFL at the time with the long-obsolete place kick, rebounded solidly in 1911 to kick 46 goals and be second in the goalkicking behind Vin Gardiner. The following year, he did even better, heading the VFL goalkicking with fifty-six goals, but a long-term illness meant Brereton could not play a single match in 1913, and despite expectations he would return for 1914, a recurrence meant he again could not appear at all.

1915, however saw him return to the Redlegs and with Roy Park provide a potent forward line that lifted Melbourne into the finals for the first time since 1902. Owing to the club's amateur tradition, however, Melbourne withdrew from the VFL from 1916 to 1918 – there were also problems with the availability of the MCG which was used mainly for schoolboy matches – and when Melbourne did resume in the VFL Brereton was cleared to join South Melbourne but did not play for them until Round 11. When he did play. however, Brereton shows he had not lost his skill, kicking eleven goals in his first two games in the red and white, including six of their record score of 29 goals 15 against St Kilda. After that, however, injury and work with the Melbourne Cricket Club caused Brereton to fade from the scene, though when South were short of forwards he was recalled from retirement at the age of thirty-five in 1922 and still kicked five goals in each of his last two games with Fitzroy and Geelong.

Later in his life, Brereton served as secretary of the Victorian Cricket Association.

References

External links 

DemonWiki profile

1887 births
1950 deaths
Australian rules footballers from Victoria (Australia)
Australian Rules footballers: place kick exponents
Port Melbourne Football Club players
Melbourne Football Club players
Sydney Swans players
VFL Leading Goalkicker Medal winners
Melbourne Cricket Club cricketers